No Rules is an album by psychedelic trance artists G.M.S. which was released in 2002.

Track listing
 "Life After" – 5:58
 "Gladiator" – 6:19
 "No Rules" – 7:34
 "I'm on Mars" – 6:43
 "Hyperactive" – 6:25
 "At the End of a Rainbow" – 6:46
 "Spliffpolitics" – 5:54
 "Juice by GMS" – 6:21
 "Overdose" – 6:59

This was released on CD and double-LP.  The track "Overdose" was not on the LP version.

2002 albums
GMS (music group) albums
Spirit Zone Records albums